

List

Notes

a.    British motorists are credited with being the first to christen the 1930s Fiat 500A “Little Mouse” or Topolino in Italian. The nickname was universally adopted by the public, but never officially adopted by Fiat.
b.    At some time the company was restructured to become Sipani Automobiles Ltd, sources vary widely as to the year that this took place. In 1982 the company began production of a licence built Reliant Kitten under the name Sipani Dolphin

References

I